Confession is a 1937 drama film starring Kay Francis, Ian Hunter, Basil Rathbone and Jane Bryan. It was directed by Joe May and is a scene-for-scene remake of the 1935 German film Mazurka starring Pola Negri, which Warner Brothers Studios acquired the U.S. distribution rights for and then shelved in favour of the remake.

With an estimated $513,000 budget, it started production in March 1937 and was released August 19, 1937, in New York City.

Plot
"In a European city in the year 1930," 17-year-old music student Lisa Koslov (Bryan) sees her mother off at the train station, and as she is leaving, is handed an envelope containing two tickets to a piano concert she suspects come from a well-dressed man she thinks may be stalking her. Her friend Hildegard persuades her to attend the concert and realizes the man is the pianist himself, the renowned Michael Michailow (Rathbone). On Lisa's behalf, Hildegard accepts Michailow's dinner invitation to Lisa when she has misgivings.  There he suavely pleads his loneliness and begs to see her the next day. When she goes to her conservatory lessons instead, she discovers that he has lied to the professor to insinuate himself as her tutor.  Michailow kisses Lisa, who despite awareness that the situation is unsavory, responds to the kiss.

The third day, when her mother returns, Michailow calls Lisa at home and persuades her to sneak out. He takes her to a seamy cabaret to continue his patient seduction where he won't be recognized.  During a suggestive number sung by tawdry chanteuse Vera Kowalska (Francis), the couple are illuminated in a spotlight as Michailow again kisses Lisa. Vera and Michailow recognize one another and she faints from shock. He tries to leave hastily with Lisa, but Vera shoots him dead. At her trial Vera confesses to the murder but refuses to disclose her motive. As the lawyers are making their closing speeches, her newly discovered suitcase is brought as evidence before the presiding judge (Crisp). When he orders it opened to attempt to determine if it contains mitigating evidence, Vera abruptly decides to give a full statement to the court if the suitcase is not opened and the courtroom cleared of all witnesses and spectators.

Vera reveals that in 1912 she was a young diva in Warsaw appearing in an opera composed by Michailow, a womanizer who claimed to be madly in love with her.  She left the company to marry soldier Leonide Kirow (Hunter), and three years later was a mother with a husband at war. At her doctor's advice, Vera attended a charity ball, where she was reunited with her old company, including Michailow. He lured her to a party at his apartment, where she became drunk and passed out. The next morning, while pondering how to tell her husband before gossip reached him, he returned from the front as an amputee, and out of a sense of guilt she remained silent.  Michailow bombarded her with letters begging to see her, which she hid from Leonide without answering them, until one day she went to Michailow to warn him to stop.  Leonide followed her, and thinking the worst, sued her for adultery.  Michailow fled to avoid testifying on her behalf, and she was found guilty, losing custody of her daughter.

For fifteen years, reduced to being a cheap singer, Vera searched Europe for Leonide (who had changed his name to Koslov and disappeared) and her child. When she at last located them (the day of the shooting), she learned that Leonide has been dead three years and that he had remarried. Her daughter, who is Lisa, has no idea that the second wife is not her real mother. Vera's suitcase contains papers proving her statement, and she testified to prevent them from being read in open court, to save Lisa's reputation and her relationship with the woman she believes is her mother. When open session resumes, all the parties avoid any mention of the details, and while Vera is found guilty, the court grants her a pardon. After the trial, Lisa approaches Vera to wish her well. Vera has a fantasy of warmly embracing her daughter, but instead calmly thanks her and happily watches her drive away.

Cast
 Kay Francis as Vera
 Ian Hunter as Leonide
 Basil Rathbone as Michael Michailow
 Jane Bryan as Lisa
 Donald Crisp as the Presiding Judge
 Mary Maguire as Hildegard
 Dorothy Peterson as Mrs. Koslov
 Laura Hope Crews as Stella
 Robert Barrat as the Prosecuting Attorney
 Ben Welden as the Defense Attorney
 Veda Ann Borg as Xenia
 Joan Valerie as Wanda (credited as Helen Valkis)

Notes

External links
 
 
 
 

American black-and-white films
American remakes of German films
Films directed by Joe May
Warner Bros. films
1937 drama films
1937 films
American drama films
1930s American films